The Greater Reading Expo Center  was an exhibition center located just north of Reading, Pennsylvania and access from the Warren Street Bypass (Route 12.) It had 30 meeting rooms, two food courts, and a total area of over 270,000 square feet on one floor. The expo center opened in 2006 and closed in 2013.

References

External links

Buildings and structures in Berks County, Pennsylvania
Convention centers in Pennsylvania